Subgum or sub gum (traditional: 什錦; simplified: 什锦; Cantonese: sap6 gam2; pinyin: shí jǐn; literally "ten brocades", metaphorically "numerous and varied") is a type of Chinese dish in which one or more meats or seafood are mixed with vegetables and sometimes also noodles, rice, or soup. It originates from Cantonese cuisine and is a common dish on the menus of Chinese restaurants in North America.

In the United States of America

The earliest known mention of subgum is in 1902 in a list of Chinese dishes in the Chicago Daily Tribune. An early indirect mention of sub-gum is in 1906; in 1909, there is a more explicit reference to sub gum deang at a Chicago restaurant and in 1913, to sub gum gai suey at a New York City restaurant.

See also
Chop suey
Champon

Notes

External links
Vegetable subgum lo mein photo

See also
American Chinese cuisine

American Chinese cuisine
Cantonese cuisine